Midar (Tarifit: Miḍar, ⵎⵉⴹⴰⵕ; Arabic: ميضار) is a municipality in Driouch Province, Oriental, Morocco. According to the 2014 census, it has a population of 17,030.

Towns

References

Populated places in Driouch Province